Zhongtong may refer to the following:

Present-day
People
 Gen. Sun Zhongtong (1944–) of the People's Republic of China

Company
 Zhongtong Bus (Zhōngtōng Kèchē), a Chinese bus company 

Places
 Zhongtong Township in Jiangxi
 Zhongtong Street Subdistrict in the Weibin District of Xinxiang, Henan

Historical
 Zhongtong Era (Zhōngtǒng), the era name of Kublai Khan of the Yuan Dynasty for the period 1260–1264
 Zhongtong Emperor (Zhōngtǒngdi), another name for Kublai Khan
 Zhongtong notes, a form of jiaochao, the paper money of the Yuan Empire
 Gen. Xianyu Zhongtong (8th century) of the Tang Dynasty
 Zhongtong, the style name of Wang Jing, an official of the Eastern Han dynasty
 Zhongtong (Zhōngtǒng), the former nickname of the Central Bureau of Investigation and Statistics of the Republic of China